Tujan (also Romanized as Tūjan) is a village in Gafr and Parmon Rural District, Gafr and Parmon District, Bashagard County, Hormozgan Province, Iran. At the 2006 census, its population was 28, in 7 families.

References 

Populated places in Bashagard County